The 1990 Stormseal Matchroom League was a  professional non-ranking snooker tournament that was played from 25 January to 20 May 1990.

Steve Davis topped the table and won the tournament. 


League phase

If points were level then match wins, followed by most frames won determined their positions. If two players had an identical record then the result in their match determined their positions. If that ended 4–4 then the player who got to four first was higher.

 25 January – The Hawth, Crawley
 Stephen Hendry 5–3 Willie Thorne
 27 January – Medway Arts Centre, Chatham
 Neal Foulds 5–3 Cliff Thorburn
 Doug Mountjoy 5–3 Tony Meo
 28 January – St David's Hall, Cardiff
 Tony Meo 5–3 Neal Foulds
 Steve Davis 7–1 Willie Thorne
 2 February – Warwick Arts Centre, Coventry
 Dennis Taylor 4–4 Stephen Hendry
 3 February – Gateshead Lesuire Centre, Gateshead
 Dennis Taylor 6–2 Tony Meo 
 Stephen Hendry 6–2 Cliff Thorburn
 14 February – Central Hall, York
 Jimmy White 4–4 Willie Thorne
 15 February – Town Hall, St Helens
 Cliff Thorburn 5–3 John Parrott
 17 February – Aberdeen Exhibition and Conference Centre, Aberdeen
 Neal Foulds 7–1 John Parrott
 Jimmy White 4–4 Steve Davis
 23 March – The Dome, Morecambe
 Willie Thorne 6–2 Tony Meo
 25 March – Sands Centre, Carlisle
 Doug Mountjoy 4–4 Willie Thorne
 Jimmy White 5–3 John Parrott
 5 April – Thornaby Pavilion, Thornaby-on-Tees
 Steve Davis 6–2 Cliff Thorburn
 6 April – Parr Hall, Warrington
 Stephen Hendry 6–2 Neal Foulds
 7 April – Metrodome Leisure Complex, Barnsley
 Neal Foulds 8–0 Dennis Taylor
 Stephen Hendry 5–3 Doug Mountjoy
 8 April – Octagon Theatre, Bolton
 Willie Thorne 6–2 Cliff Thorburn
 Dennis Taylor 4–4 John Parrott
 2 May – The Bowl, Redcar
 Steve Davis 5–3 Doug Mountjoy
 3 May – Northgate Arena Leisure Centre, Chester
 Steve Davis 5–3 Neal Foulds
 4 May – Castle Leisure Centre, Bury
 John Parrott 5–3 Stephen Hendry
 5 May – The Dome, Doncaster
 Willie Thorne 5–3 Neal Foulds
 Steve Davis 5–3 Tony Meo
 6 May – Fairfield Halls, Croydon
 Tony Meo 5–3 Cliff Thorburn
 Steve Davis 4–4 John Parrott
 7 May – New Victoria Theatre, Newcastle-under-Lyme
 Willie Thorne 4–4 John Parrott
 Cliff Thorburn 7–1 Jimmy White
 8 May – Taliesin Arts Centre, Swansea University, Swansea
 Doug Mountjoy 4–4 Dennis Taylor
 10 May – Walsall Council House, Walsall
 Jimmy White 4–4 Neal Foulds
 11 May – Queensway Hall, Dunstable
 Doug Mountjoy 5–3 Jimmy White
 12 May – Meadowside Centre, Burton upon Trent 
 Doug Mountjoy 6–2 Neal Foulds
 Tony Meo 5–3 Stephen Hendry
 13 May – Harrogate International Centre, Harrogate
 Doug Mountjoy 5–3 John Parrott
 Steve Davis 6–2 Dennis Taylor
 14 May – Oldham Sports Centre, Oldham
 Jimmy White 5–3 Stephen Hendry
 16 May – The Floral Hall, Southport
 Dennis Taylor 6–2 Jimmy White
 17 May – Burnley Mechanics Theatre, Burnley
 Willie Thorne 5–3 Dennis Taylor
 18 May – Stoke Rochford Hall, near Grantham
 Dennis Taylor 5–3 Cliff Thorburn
 19 May – Watford Town Hall, Watford
 Cliff Thorburn 6–2 Doug Mountjoy
 Tony Meo 4–4 Jimmy White
 20 May – Brentwood International Centre, Brentwood
 John Parrott 6–2 Tony Meo
 Stephen Hendry 6–2 Steve Davis

References

Premier League Snooker
1990 in snooker
1990 in British sport